Monk Fryston railway station  was a railway station serving the village of Monk Fryston in North Yorkshire, England. Previously, Milford Junction and Old Junction (Gascoigne Wood) served as an interchange between the Leeds and Selby and the York and North Midland Lines, however when they closed in the early 1900s, Monk Fryston was opened to cover for this loss of interchange. Though the station had four tracks through it, it only ever had two platforms. The station closed to passengers in 1959, and then completely in 1964.

History
Monk Fryston station was opened in October 1904, some 64 years after the railway had arrived in the locale. The closure of Milford Junction station to the north, created a loss for local passengers and some interchanges between trains. Monk Fryston was opened partially to alleviate this problem. The station is listed as having cost £639 to build in 1904. The two easternmost tracks did not have platforms.

The station was equipped with a siding next to the northbound platform line, and a signal box between the two sets of running lines. The main exports from the station were grain and vegetables in bulk. The station was listed as being able to handle livestock, general goods, and coal. It was serviced by stopping local trains, though diversions from the East Coast Main Line were often seen through the station.

Monk Fryston was closed to passengers on 14 September 1959, and the station was classified as a public delivery siding for goods. Monk Fryston closed completely in May 1964.

Services
In 1906 when services were operated by the North Eastern Railway (NER), the station had four trains a day each-way between Sheffield and York via . The service through Castleford towards York, saw double the amount of trains per day. In 1913, services operated by the NER amounted to seven each way between York and Normanton. 

By 1935, the LNER were operating most services with at least nine trains calling at the station. In 1946, the LMS provided three trains each way between Sheffield and York, and the LNER provided one direct service from Manchester to Selby, four between Normanton and York, and four between Sheffield and York.

Notes

References

Sources

External links
Monk Fryston station on navigable 1947 O. S. map

Former North Eastern Railway (UK) stations
Railway stations in Great Britain opened in 1904
Railway stations in Great Britain closed in 1964
Disused railway stations in North Yorkshire